Artyom Romanovich Sukhanov (born 29 May 2001) is a Russian football player who plays as a right back for FC Arsenal Tula.

Club career
He made his debut in the Russian Premier League for FC Arsenal Tula on 15 August 2021 in a game against FC Krasnodar.

Career statistics

References

External links
 
 
 

2001 births
Footballers from Vologda
Living people
Russian footballers
Association football defenders
FC Lokomotiv Moscow players
FC Arsenal Tula players
Russian Premier League players
Russian First League players
Russian Second League players